Diaphus antonbruuni is a species of lanternfish found in the Indian Ocean.

Size

Etymology
The fish is named in honor of the Danish marine biologist Anton Frederick Bruun (1901–1961) and the research vessel Anton Bruun that bore his name and which collected the type specimen.

References

Myctophidae
Taxa named by Basil Nafpaktitis
Fish described in 1978